Trevor Albert is an American film producer.  He is known for producing the film Groundhog Day (1993).  Albert is from Los Angeles and is former Chairman of The Harold Ramis Film School at Second City. He is also a successful abstract painter with a studio in Los Angeles,California. Abstractlands.com

TREVOR ALBERT started his journey as a communications and visual arts major at UC San Diego and worked his way through college as a journalist for the San Diego Reader. Upon graduation, he moved up the California coast to pursue a film career in LA. After working as a film researcher at Universal Pictures and Warner Brothers, he accepted a full-time position at the production company of world renowned singer actress director Barbra Streisand and In his first year, he was sent to Florida to work with Harold Ramis on Caddyshack, his directorial debut. Trevor and Harold instantly developed a great rapport based on their mutual love of movies and the Marx Brothers.

When Albert agreed to be the gopher puppet in several scenes on the golf course, a professional relationship was cemented that would last for over 20 years. Together they made a series of very successful comedies including National Lampoon’s Vacation with Chevy Chase, Club Paradise with Robin Williams and Peter O’Toole, Groundhog Day with Bill Murray and Andie McDowell, Multiplicity with Michael Keaton and Andie McDowell, Stuart Saves his Family with Al Franken and Bedazzled, starring Brendan Fraser and Elizabeth Hurley.

After many years in Hollywood, Ramis and his family decided to move back to his hometown of Chicago, and Albert stayed in LA and started a new film company. Having worked for many years exclusively in the world of comedy, Albert decided to venture into the world of graphic novels, producing The League of Extraordinary Gentlemen starring Sean Connery. Following that he produced The First Twenty Million is The Hardest based on the novel by Pro Bronson, starring Rosario Dawson, and then the classic children’s film Because of Winn-Dixie based on the Newbery award winning book by Kate DiCamillo, starring Cicely Tyson, Jeff Daniels, Eve Marie Saint, Dave Matthews and Anna Sophia Robb and then the independent film Waiting For Forever, starring Richard Jenkins, Blythe Danner and Rachel Bilson. Gratified to make films that are entertaining, sometimes intelligent and occasionally inspiring, Albert is a distinguished member of the Academy of Motion Picture Arts and Sciences.

His most recent and perhaps proudest production is the Academy Award® nominated documentary, Glen Campbell: I’ll Be Me, which follows the iconic musician Campbell on his unprecedented tour across America, after being diagnosed with Alzheimer’s disease. Richard Roeper called it “one of the most remarkable documentaries in recent years.” It opened theatrically in US in 2014 and had its World TV premier on CNN in June where it was the highest rated film in the history of CNN.

In 2015 Albert was approached by Second City in Chicago the legendary comedy  institution to help start a film school under the umbrella of Second City. Albert became the chair of The Harold Ramis Film school and continued in the position until 2020.

After several decades as a filmaker Albert decided to take a slight detour and turn a part time passion as a painter into a full time endeavor. He currently has a painting studio in Santa Monica California and his work has been sold to private collectors around the world. Abstractlands.com

Filmography

References

External links
 

Living people
Film producers from Illinois
American film producers
Year of birth missing (living people)